Saint-Launeuc is a commune in the Côtes-d'Armor department of Brittany in northwestern France.

Geography
The river Meu forms the commune's southern border. The Rance forms the commune's northern border.

Population
Inhabitants of Saint-Launeuc are called launeucois in French.

See also
Communes of the Côtes-d'Armor department

References

External links

Official website 

Communes of Côtes-d'Armor